Grant Connell and Todd Martin were the defending champions but did not compete that year.

Jan Apell and Brent Haygarth won in the final 3–6, 6–1, 6–3 against Pat Cash and Patrick Rafter.

Seeds
Champion seeds are indicated in bold text while text in italics indicates the round in which those seeds were eliminated.

 Jan Apell /  Brent Haygarth (champions)
 Luke Jensen /  Murphy Jensen (quarterfinals)
 Rikard Bergh /  Shelby Cannon (first round)
 Javier Frana /  Karel Nováček (quarterfinals)

Draw

References
 1996 XL Bermuda Open Doubles Draw

XL Bermuda Open
1996 ATP Tour